Ahmadabad Rural District is in Takht-e Soleyman District of Takab County, West Azerbaijan province, Iran. At the National Census of 2006, its population was 11,096 in 2,212 households. There were 10,120 inhabitants in 2,579 households at the following census of 2011. At the most recent census of 2016, the population of the rural district was 10,259 in 3,087 households. The largest of its 27 villages was Ahmadabad-e Sofla, with 2,046 people.

References 

Takab County

Rural Districts of West Azerbaijan Province

Populated places in West Azerbaijan Province

Populated places in Takab County